Grumman was a station along the Main Line of the Long Island Rail Road (LIRR) at South Oyster Bay Road that served employees of Grumman Engineering Aircraft Corporation, at the Grumman Bethpage Airport.

History 
With the outbreak of World War II, demand at Grumman increased, as it got federal contracts to build war planes. On January 22, 1942 it was announced that a station would be built to serve the local plant. The station opened on February 2 with two trains in the morning heading east and two trains in the evening heading west; service was expanded further in the fall. The station was built with a wooden shelter. Grumman needed to extend its airfield runway in 1950, requiring that South Oyster Bay Road, the grade crossing, and the station be moved. The LIRR protested the change, fearing that the extended runway increased the likelihood for a crash between a train and a plane. The LIRR lost its case in December 1950. The new road, station and crossing opened on February 19, 1951. The new eastbound platform was located east of the new road crossing, and the new westbound platform was west of the new crossing. Metal shelter sheds were built during the 1960s.

Ridership declined as the Grumman facility was downsized, and as a result service was reduced to one morning train in each direction, and one afternoon westbound flag stop by 1958. On March 28, 1985, at a meeting with village officials in Farmingdale, the LIRR announced that the electrification of the Main Line to Ronkonkoma required the closing of either the Farmingdale, Bethpage or Grumman stations. Since Grumman had fewer than ten daily passengers, all of whom were employees of Grumman, the station closed on December 2, 1985, with the last train scheduled on November 29. The former airport is now the Nassau County Police Heliport. Nothing remains of the former station today.

References

External links
Grumman and Republic and the Long Island Rail Road (Arrt's Arrchives)

Bethpage, New York
Airport railway stations in the United States
Former Long Island Rail Road stations in Nassau County, New York
Railway stations in the United States opened in 1942
Railway stations closed in 1985
1942 establishments in New York (state)
1985 disestablishments in New York (state)